The 21st Canadian Film Awards were held on October 4, 1969 to honour achievements in Canadian film. The ceremony was hosted by Fred Davis.

The most historically unusual characteristic of the 1969 Canadian Film Awards was that not a single theatrical feature film was entered into competition. Several theatrical films whose directors had intended to submit them to the awards committee were not completed by the submission deadline, and a few feature films which had been submitted were deemed not of award-worthy quality. The award for Film of the Year was presented to the television film The Best Damn Fiddler from Calabogie to Kaladar, but the awards were otherwise presented solely in the non-feature categories.

Winners

Films
Film of the Year: The Best Damn Fiddler from Calabogie to Kaladar - National Film Board of Canada, John Kemeny and Barrie Howells producers, Peter Pearson director
Feature Film: Not awarded
Film Under 30 Minutes: At Home - Allan King Associates, Martin Lavut director
Film Over 30 Minutes: Vertige - National Film Board of Canada, Gilles Boivin and Clément Perron producers, Jean Beaudin director 
Documentary Under 30 Minutes: Juggernaut - National Film Board of Canada, Walford Hewitson producer, Eugene Boyko director
Documentary Over 30 Minutes: Good Times Bad Times - Canadian Broadcasting Corporation, Donald Shebib producer and director
Animated: Walking - National Film Board of Canada, Ryan Larkin producer and director
TV Drama: The Best Damn Fiddler from Calabogie to Kaladar - National Film Board of Canada, John Kemeny and Barrie Howells producers, Peter Pearson director
TV Information: The Style Is the Man Himself - Canadian Broadcasting Corporation, Cameron Graham producer
Sports and Recreation: Les canots de glace (Ice Rally in Quebec) - Office du Film du Québec, Jean-Claude Labrecque producer
Public Relations: Rye on the Rocks - Westminster Films, Don Haldane producer
Sales Promotion: More Logs Follow the Leader - Peterson Productions, S. Dean Peterson producer

Technical Development and Innovation Awards
Warren Collins for Musical Chairs
Kar Liang and John Pley "for the application of computer control to animation stand cinematography".

Non-Feature Craft Awards
Performance by a Lead Actor: Chris Wiggins - The Best Damn Fiddler from Calabogie to Kaladar (NFB)
Performance by a Lead Actress: Jackie Burroughs - Dulcima (CBC)
Supporting Actor: Michael Posner - And No Birds Sing (University of Manitoba Students' Union)
Supporting Actress: Ruth Springford - Corwin: Does Anybody Here Know Denny? (CBC)
Art Direction: Michael Milne - The Best Damn Fiddler from Calabogie to Kaladar (NFB)
Black-and-White Cinematography: Tony Ianzelo - The Best Damn Fiddler from Calabogie to Kaladar (NFB)
Colour Cinematography: Réo Grégoire - Là ou Ailleurs (No Matter Where) (NFB)
Direction: Peter Pearson - The Best Damn Fiddler from Calabogie to Kaladar (NFB)
Film Editing: Michael McKennirey - The Best Damn Fiddler from Calabogie to Kaladar (NFB)
Sound Editing: Donald Shebib - Good Times Bad Times
Screenplay: Joan Finnigan - The Best Damn Fiddler from Calabogie to Kaladar (NFB)
Written Commentary: James Carney - In One Day (NFB)
Sound Recording: Hans Oomes - Saul Alinsky Went to War (NFB)
Sound Re-Recording: Ron Alexander - Les canots de glace (Office du Film du Québec)

Special Awards
Margot Kidder, "in recognition of an outstanding new talent for Corwin: Does Anybody Here Know Denny? (CBC)
Serge Gerand, "for outstanding original achievement in Motion Pictures scoring in Vertige".
John Drainie Award: Andrew Allan, for "distinguished service to broadcasting".
Wendy Michener Award: Jean-Claude Labrecque "for outstanding artistic achievement".

References

Canadian
Canadian Film Awards (1949–1978)
1969 in Canada